Leonard Allan Atkinson  (6 December 1906 – 14 January 1998) was a Chairman of the Public Service Commission and Chairman of the State Services Commission in New Zealand. He served for eight consecutive years.

In the 1963 New Year Honours, Atkinson was appointed a Companion of the Order of St Michael and St George.

References

1906 births
1998 deaths
New Zealand public servants
New Zealand Companions of the Order of St Michael and St George